Locomotor mimicry is a subtype of Batesian mimicry in which animals avoid predation by mimicking the movements of another species phylogenetically separated. This can be in the form of mimicking a less desirable species or by mimicking the predator itself. Animals can show similarity in swimming, walking, or flying of their model animals.

The complex interaction between mimics, models, and predators (sometimes called observers) can help explain similarities amongst species beyond ideas that emerge from evolutionary comparative approaches. In terms of overall movement, the continuous locomotor mimicry of a species that differs anatomically from the mimic may increase metabolic cost. However, the benefit of avoiding predation appears to outweigh the increased energy cost, because mimicking animals tend to have higher survival rates than their non-mimicking counterparts.

Terrestrial locomotor mimicry 

The most common form of locomotor terrestrial mimicry is found in ant-mimicking spiders. These mimics are capable of antennal illusions and similar gait patterns as an ant, which is shown in the jumping spider family (Araneae, Salticidae). Ants appear to be beneficial models because they possess effective protective traits such as, chemical defences, and aggressiveness. Spiders, however, lack some of these specialized traits and therefore by acting as an ant, may avoid predation because the predator has less desire for ants.

Mimetic jumping spiders will imitate the zig-zag trajectories of ants, which appears to be beneficial for avoiding predators that are from an elevated vantage point. However, this may be an example of imperfect mimicry because the spiders will display this behaviour in settings where ants do not.

It was once thought that these ant-mimicking spiders walk on 6 legs instead of 8 so that they could use a set of legs to mimic ant antennae. However, further analysis revealed that the spiders only do this whilst stationary, which leads to the assumption that there may be a limit to the neural circuitry underlying limb movement that does not allow them to move on 6 legs. This antennal mimicry appears to be most beneficial whilst in a close proximity to a predator.

Another example of terrestrial locomotor mimicry is seen in salticid-mimicking moths. The moths fan out their hind wings and their forewings are raised above their bodies. In this position, the moth's wings look like salticid legs. Moths that resemble the appearance and locomotion of predatory spiders are preyed upon less by the spiders. The spiders will even display courtship or territorial behaviour towards the mimics, indicating that the spiders misidentify the moths as conspecifics. Even if the spiders eventually eat the moths, the time it takes for the first attack to occur is longer than the time taken to attack non-mimetic moths.

Aerial locomotor mimicry 
In butterflies, it is thought that palatability to predators is related to flight components. Typically, fast-flying prey are more palatable, whereas unpalatable species tend to fly more slowly. These flight characteristics could help predators recognize prey as being palatable or unpalatable. Researchers compared the flight patterns of palatable non-mimetic, palatable mimetic, and unpalatable butterflies by looking at directional flight changes of each species. It was determined that the palatable mimetic butterfly species had a significantly different flight pattern compared to the palatable non-mimetic. The palatable mimetic species had a flight pattern that resembled that of their unpalatable models.

Another example of aerial locomotor mimicry is found in the common drone fly (Eristalis tenax) and its presumed model, the western honey bee (Apis mellifera). In analyses of flight sequences, flight velocities, flight trajectories, and time spent hovering, it was found that the flight patterns of common drone flies were more similar to honey bees than to that of other flies. The drone flies and their models both exhibit loops in their flight paths, which is surprising for the drone flies because they are very adept fliers. A likely explanation for this flight behaviour is that, while foraging, the drone flies are at increased risk of predation by birds and therefore they alter their flying to resemble the noxious honeybee and avoid predation.

Inanimate object locomotor mimicry 
The ghost pipefish is able to blend into its surroundings due to its similarity in colour and motion to sea plants. In order to avoid predators, the organism will sway in the water to resemble underwater vegetation as much as possible.

See also 
 Ant mimicry
 Anti-predator adaptation 
 Batesian mimicry 
 Defensive mimicry
 Mimicry

References 

Mimicry
Animal locomotion